"Breakin' Away" is a song by British singer Kim Wilde, released in September 1995 as the first single from her ninth album, Now & Forever (1995). Wilde had initially made her name in the 1980s as the highest-selling British female soloist of that decade. She had also earned some degree of success in the early 1990s. "Breakin' Away" was released both in its original form and as several different extended remixes on the 12" and CD-single formats. On the CD-single and cassette single, a song called "Staying with My Baby" was also included. This track was somewhat exclusive as it was only included on the Japanese issue of the Now & Forever album.

Critical reception
Larry Flick from Billboard commented, "It has been awhile since the seemingly ageless Kim Wilde delivered a single as good as her U.K. single, "Breakin' Away". Under the production guidance of brother Ricki Wilde and the ever-fab Serious Rope, she is the picture of sweet, girlish charm, gleefully romping through the track's plush retro-disco arrangement." Pan-European magazine Music & Media wrote that "this fast-moving dance track introduces us to an up-to-date Kim Wilde. She lets the world know that "we've got to move forward" and that's exactly what she's doing with this single, which should be welcomed by dance and EHR stations." A reviewer from Music Week noted, "Anyone else on vocals and this marshmallow pop could pass unnoticed, but the massive past success of Wilde should see her getting a chart slot." James Hamilton from the RM Dance Update deemed it as a "breezily harmonized romping chunky strider – sorta Madonna meets Manhattan Transfer".

Track listing
 CD single, Europe (1995)
"Breakin' Away" (Radio Mix) – 3:35
"Breakin' Away" (Original 12" Mix) – 6:29
"Breakin' Away" (Matt Darey Vocal Mix) – 6:15
"Staying with My Baby" (Radio Mix) – 4:28

Charts

References

1995 singles
1995 songs
British dance-pop songs
Kim Wilde songs
MCA Records singles
Songs written by Mike Percy (musician)
Songs written by Tim Lever
Songs written by Tracy Ackerman